Ama Dablam is a mountain in the eastern Himalayan range of Province No. 1, Nepal. Ama Dablam means "Mother's necklace"; the long ridges on each side like the arms of a mother (ama) protecting her child, and the hanging glacier thought of as the dablam, the traditional double-pendant containing pictures of the gods, worn by Sherpa women. For several days, Ama Dablam dominates the eastern sky for anyone trekking to Mount Everest Base Camp. For its soaring ridges and steep faces Ama Dablam is sometimes referred as the "Matterhorn of the Himalayas." The mountain is featured on the one rupee Nepalese banknote.

Ama Dablam was first climbed on 13 March 1961 by Mike Gill (NZ), Barry Bishop (USA), Mike Ward (UK) and Wally Romanes (NZ) via the Southwest Ridge.  They were well-acclimatised to altitude, having wintered over at 5800 metres near the base of the peak as part of the 1960–61 Silver Hut expedition, led by Sir Edmund Hillary.

Situated at a distance of 162 km north of the provincial capital of Biratnagar and 152 km northeast to Kathmandu, Ama Dablam is the third most popular Himalayan peak for permitted expeditions. The most popular route by far is the Southwest Ridge (right skyline in the photo). Prior to a 2006 avalanche, climbers typically set up three camps along the ridge with Camp III just below and to the right of the hanging glacier, the Dablam. Any ice that calves off the glacier typically goes left, away from the camp. However, after the avalanche, climbers now prefer to set just two camps to minimize risk. A climbing permit and a liaison officer are required when attempting Ama Dablam. As with Mount Everest, the best climbing months are April–May (before the monsoon) and September–October.

Notable ascents 
 1961 Southwest Ridge (VI 5.9 60deg 1500m) FA (First Ascent) by Mike Gill (NZ), Barry Bishop (US), Mike Ward (UK) and Wally Romanes (NZ), see 1960-61 Silver Hut expedition.
 1979 Southwest Ridge SA by Martin Boysen (UK); Tom Frost, David Breashears, Greg Lowe, Jeff Lowe, Peter Pilafian, Jonathan Wright (all US), and Lhakpa Dorje (Nepal) reached the summit on 22 April in blizzard conditions, as part of a well-financed climb-and-film expedition. Doug Robinson and John Wasson (both USA) reached the summit the next day.
 1979 Lowe Route on the South Face (VI AI4 M5 1200m), FA Solo by Jeff Lowe, 30 April 1979.
 1981 Northeast Spur to North Ridge (VI 5.7 70deg 1500m) by Tim McCartney-Snape, Lincoln Hall, and Andrew Henderson (AUS).
 1984 Southwest Ridge solo by Naoe Sakashita (JP).
 1985 Ariake-Sakashita on the west face (VI 5.7 65deg 1400m) by Masayuki Ariake and Naoe Sakashita (both JP).
 1985 Northeast Face (VI mixed 90deg 1400m) winter ascent by Michael Kennedy and Carlos Buhler (both US).
 1996 North Ridge Austro-German alpine-style ascent by Friedl Huber, Max Berger, Alois Badegruber, and Roman Dirnböck.
 2001 Northwest Ridge (VI Scottish 7, 2000m) by Jules Cartwright and Rich Cross (both UK).
2021 by Asma Al Thani, the first Qatari woman to summit.

Accidents
On the night of 13/14 November 2006, a large serac collapse occurred from the hanging glacier, which swept away several tents at Camp III, killing six climbers (3 European, 3 Sherpa). Eyewitness testimony indicates that Camp III had not been sited in an unusual or abnormally dangerous spot, and that the serac fall was of such magnitude as to render the specific placing of the tents at Camp III irrelevant.

On November 28, 2016, highly acclaimed climbing Sherpa Lakpa Thundu Sherpa of Pangboche was killed when a 5.4 magnitude earthquake struck, triggering an avalanche and the release of a few ice blocks.

On November 11, 2017, Valery Rozov was killed when he jumped from the mountain in a wingsuit and struck a cliff.

In popular culture
A representation of Ama Dablam was originally used by Invesco Perpetual as its branding logo within the UK. It has since been adopted by the INVESCO group of companies as its worldwide signature.

See also
Chankheli Peak, another mountain in Nepal often mistaken for Ama Dablam

References
Notes

Sources

External links

Ama Dablam on Globetrooper
Ama Dablam on Summitpost
Ama Dablam on Peakware

Mountains of Koshi Province
Six-thousanders of the Himalayas